The Murder of Stephen Lawrence is a British television true crime drama film, written and directed by Paul Greengrass, that first broadcast on ITV on 18 February 1999.

The film, based on the murder committed on 22 April 1993, follows Stephen's parents' Doreen and Neville's quest for justice as a gang of racists are tried for their son's murder. Marianne Jean-Baptiste and Hugh Quarshie star as Doreen and Neville, with Leon Black playing Stephen, and Ashley Walters, Millicent Gezi, Joseph Kpobie and Brian Bovell also amongst the main cast.

Production
The film was first conceived in 1997, with then head of drama at ITV, Nick Elliott, commissioning the project before a script had even been written. Producer Mark Readhead said a key part of the film was to "concentrate on the personal, rather than police, procedures", in order to create a "true story". The film was notable for being actress Jean-Baptiste's first British screen role since her Oscar nomination for Secrets and Lies.

Cast
 Marianne Jean-Baptiste as Doreen Lawrence
 Hugh Quarshie as Neville Lawrence
 Leon Black as Stephen Lawrence
 Ashley Walters as Stuart Lawrence
 Millicent Gezi as Georgina Lawrence
 Joseph Kpobie as Duwayne Brooks
 Brian Bovell as Uncle
 Jo Martin as Cheryl Sloley
 Shaun Chawdhary as Imran Khan
 Kenneth Cranham as Michael Mansfield QC
 David Calder as Sir Paul Condon
 Stafford Gordon as DAC Ian Johnston
 Michael Feast as DCS Ilsley
 David Schaal as DS Bevan
 Jenny Tarren as WDC Holden
 Natasha Williams as Clara
 Dona Croll as Ros Howells OBE
 Ricci Harnett as Neil Acourt
 Lee Colley as Jamie Acourt
 Darren Morfitt as Luke Knight
 Neil Maskell as Gary Dobson
 Dominic Power as David Norris

Home media
The film was released on VHS in the United States on 23 April 2002, but this remains the only home release.

Legacy and sequel
In the wake of various Black Lives Matter protests, and as part of ITV's "Black Voices" strand, the drama was repeated on ITV in July 2020, immediately after an hour-long debate programme titled Stephen Lawrence: Has Britain Changed?

In July 2020, it was announced that a new, three-part sequel to the 1999 drama had been commissioned by ITV. The series will be set 13 years after the black teenager was killed and will depict his parents’ fight for justice. The series, entitled Stephen was broadcast from 30 August to 13 September 2021.

References

External links

1999 films
1999 television films
1999 crime drama films
BAFTA winners (television series)
British crime drama films
Television shows produced by Granada Television
ITV television dramas
Television series by ITV Studios
Films shot in London
Films directed by Paul Greengrass
Crime films based on actual events
1990s English-language films
1990s British films
British drama television films